Kelsch d'Alsace is textile of linen and cotton manufactured in Alsace, France.

Bibliography 

 Gilles Pudlowski, « Kelsch », in Dictionnaire amoureux de l’Alsace, Plon, Paris, 2010, . 
 « La dernière tisserande de kelsch », in En Alsace, 2008, 48,  (concerne la vallée de Masevaux)
 Claude Fuchs, « Kelsch histoire ! », in L’Alsace : découvertes et passions, 2002, 22, 	
 Jean-Marie Joseph, « Le Kelsch », in Annuaire de la Société des amis de la bibliothèque de Sélestat, 2007, 57, 
 Véronique Julia et Christophe Dugied, « Bleu, blanc, rouge, kelsch », in Maisons Coté Est, 2000, 5, 
 Le Kelsch au fil du temps : exposition du 28 novembre 1999 au 24 septembre 2000, Truchtersheim, Maison du Kochersberg, Imprimerie Cathal, s. l., 1999, 24 p. (catalogue d'exposition)

Linens
Cotton
Alsace